Comodo may refer to:
 Comodo, a musical term.
 Comodo Group, a privately held group of companies providing computer software
 Comodo Internet Security, an Internet security suite for Windows

See also
 Komodo (disambiguation)